

Command & Control Squadrons

Space Control Squadrons

See also
 List of United States Air Force squadrons

References

Space